From 1974–75 to 1995–96, the President's Trophy was awarded to the Canucks' most valuable player. It was originally presented by CP Air and later Canadian Airlines and the player won a pair of airline tickets with the trophy. However, many of the names matched the Cyclone Taylor Trophy (also awarded to the MVP as selected by the fans). After the '96 season the President's Trophy was discontinued and the Cyclone Taylor Trophy became the sole Canucks MVP Award.

Award winners 

1 - Shortened season due to the 1994–95 NHL lockout.

External links
 http://www.dmarchak.com/canaward.htm

President's Trophy (Canucks MVP)